Klykovskaya is a rural locality (a village) in Vinogradovsky District, Arkhangelsk Oblast, Russia. The population was 14 as of 2010. There are 2 streets.

Geography 
Klykovskaya is located on the Topsa River, 62 km southeast of Bereznik (the district's administrative centre) by road. Topsa is the nearest rural locality.

References 

Rural localities in Vinogradovsky District